Khalu  is a village in Kapurthala district of Punjab State, India. The village is administrated by a Sarpanch who is an elected representative of village as per the constitution of India and Panchayati raj (India).

Demography 
According to the report published by Census India in 2011, Khalu has 229 houses with the total population of 1,184 persons of which 621 are male and 563 females. Literacy rate of  Khalu is 63.39%, lower than the state average of 75.84%.  The population of children in the age group 0–6 years is 176 which is 14.86% of the total population. Child sex ratio is approximately 934, higher than the state average of 846.

Population data

References

External links 
  Villages in Kapurthala
 Kapurthala Villages List

Villages in Kapurthala district